The Aizoaceae, or fig-marigold family, is a large family of dicotyledonous flowering plants containing 135 genera and about 1800 species. They are commonly known as ice plants or carpet weeds. They are often called vygies in South Africa and New Zealand. Highly succulent species that resemble stones are sometimes called mesembs.

Description 

The family Aizoaceae is widely recognised by taxonomists. It once went by the botanical name "Ficoidaceae", now disallowed. The APG II system of 2003 (unchanged from the APG system of 1998) also recognizes the family, and assigns it to the order Caryophyllales in the clade core eudicots. The APG II system also classes the former families Mesembryanthemaceae Fenzl, Sesuviaceae Horan. and Tetragoniaceae Link under the family Aizoaceae.

The common Afrikaans name "vygie" meaning "small fig" refers to the fruiting capsule, which resembles the true fig. Glistening epidermal bladder cells give the family its common name "ice plants".

Most species (96%, 1782 species in 132 genera) in this family are endemic to arid or semiarid parts of Southern Africa in the Succulent Karoo. Much of the Aizoaceae's diversity is found in the Greater Cape Floristic Region, which is the most plant-diverse temperate region in the world. A few species are found in Australia and the Central Pacific area.

Most fig-marigolds are herbaceous, rarely somewhat woody, with sympodial growth and stems either erect or prostrate. Leaves are simple, opposite or alternate, and more or less succulent with entire (or rarely toothed) margins. Flowers are perfect in most species (but unisexual in some), actinomorphic, and appear singularly or in few-flowered cymes developing from the leaf axils. Sepals are typically five (3-8) and more or less connate (fused) below. True petals are absent. However, some species have numerous linear petals derived from staminodes. The seed capsules have one to numerous seeds per cell and are often hygrochastic, dispersing seeds by "jet action" when wet.

Evolution

The radiation of the Aizoaceae, specifically the subfamily Ruschioideae, was one of the most recent among the angiosperms, occurring 1.13-6.49 Mya. It is also one of the fastest radiations ever described in the angiosperms, with a diversification rate of about 4.4 species per million years. This diversification was roughly contemporaneous with major radiations in two other succulent lineages, Cactaceae and Agave.

The family includes many species that use crassulacean acid metabolism as pathway for carbon fixation. Some species in the subfamily Sesuvioideae instead use  carbon fixation, which might have evolved multiple times in the group.

Taxonomy
Because of the hyperdiversity of the Aizoaceae and the young age of the clade, many generic and species boundaries are uncertain.

Subfamily Acrosanthoideae

Genera:<ref>{{cite web|url=https://npgsweb.ars-grin.gov/gringlobal/taxon/taxonomygenuslist?id=3270&type=subfamily |title=GRIN Genera of Aizoaceae subfam. 'Acrosanthoideae |work=Germplasm Resources Information Network |access-date=2022-11-10 }}</ref>
 Acrosanthes Eckl. & Zeyh.

Subfamily Aizooideae

Genera:
 Aizoanthemopsis Klak
 Aizoanthemum Dinter ex Friedrich
 Aizoon L.
 Gunniopsis Pax
 Tetragonia L.

Subfamily Mesembryanthemoideae

Genera:

Subfamily Ruschioideae

Genera:

Tribe Ruschieae

 Acrodon N.E.Br
 Aloinopsis Schwantes
 Amphibolia L.Bolus ex A.G.J.Herre
 Antegibbaeum Schwantes ex C.Weber
 Antimima N.E.Br
 Arenifera A.G.J.Herre
 Argyroderma N.E.Br
 Astridia Dinter
 Bergeranthus Schwantes
 Bijlia N.E.Br
 Braunsia Schwantes
 Brianhuntleya Chess. et al.
 Carpobrotus N.E.Br
 Carruanthus (Schwantes) Schwantes
 Cephalophyllum N.E.Br
 Cerochlamys N.E.Br
 Chasmatophyllum Dinter & Schwantes
 Cheiridopsis N.E.Br
 Circandra N.E.Br
 Conophytum N.E.Br
 Corpuscularia Schwantes
 Cylindrophyllum Schwantes
 Delosperma N.E.Br
 Dicrocaulon N.E.Br
 Didymaotus N.E.Br
 Dinteranthus Schwantes
 Diplosoma Schwantes
 Disphyma N.E.Br
 Dracophilus (Schwantes) Dinter & Schwantes
 Drosanthemum Schwantes
 Eberlanzia Schwantes
 Ebracteola Dinter & Schwantes
 Ectotropis N.E.Br
 Enarganthe N.E.Br
 Erepsia N.E.Br
 Esterhuysenia L.Bolus
 Faucaria Schwantes
 Fenestraria N.E.Br
 Frithia N.E.Br
 Gibbaeum Haw. ex N.E.Br
 Glottiphyllum Haw. ex N.E.Br
 Hallianthus H.E.K.Hartmann
 Hereroa (Schwantes) Dinter & Schwantes
 Ihlenfeldtia H.E.K.Hartmann
 Imitaria N.E.Br
 Jacobsenia L.Bolus & Schwantes
 Jensenobotrya A.G.J.Herre
 Jordaaniella H.E.K.Hartmann
 Juttadinteria Schwantes
 Khadia N.E.Br
 Lampranthus N.E.Br
 Lapidaria (Dinter & Schwantes) N.E.Br.
 Leipoldtia L.Bolus
 Lemonanthemum Klak
 Lithops N.E.Br
 Machairophyllum Schwantes
 Malephora N.E.Br
 Malotigena Niederle
 Marlothistella Schwantes
 Mestoklema N.E.Br. ex Glen
 Meyerophytum Schwantes
 Mitrophyllum Schwantes
 Monilaria (Schwantes) Schwantes
 Mossia N.E.Br
 Muiria N.E.Br
 Namaquanthus L.Bolus
 Namibia (Schwantes) Schwantes
 Nananthus N.E.Br
 Nelia Schwantes
 Neohenricia L.Bolus
 Octopoma N.E.Br
 Odontophorus N.E.Br
 Oophytum N.E.Br
 Orthopterum L.Bolus
 Oscularia Schwantes
 Ottosonderia L.Bolus
 Phiambolia Klak
 Pleiospilos N.E.Br
 Polymita N.E.Br
 Psammophora Dinter & Schwantes
 Rabiea N.E.Br
 Rhinephyllum N.E.Br
 Rhombophyllum (Schwantes) Schwantes
 Roosia van Jaarsv.
 Ruschia Schwantes
 Ruschianthemum Friedrich
 Ruschianthus L.Bolus
 Sarcozona J.M.Black
 Schlechteranthus Schwantes
 Schwantesia Dinter
 Scopelogena L.Bolus
 Smicrostigma N.E.Br
 Stayneria L.Bolus
 Stoeberia Dinter & Schwantes
 Stomatium Schwantes
 Tanquana H.E.K.Hartmann & Liede
 Titanopsis Schwantes
 Trichodiadema Schwantes
 Vanheerdea L.Bolus ex H.E.K.Hartmann
 Vanzijlia L.Bolus
 Vlokia S.A.Hammer
 Wooleya L.Bolus
 Zeuktophyllum N.E.Br

Subfamily Sesuvioideae

This subfamily includes a number of  species.

Genera:
 Anisostigma Schinz
 Sesuvium L.
 Trianthema L.
 Tribulocarpus S.Moore
 Zaleya Burm.f.

Unplaced genera
Include;
 Hammeria 
 Peersia 

Uses

Several genera are cultivated. Lithops, or "living stones", are popular as novelty house plants because of their stone-like appearance.

Some species are edible, including:
 Carpobrotus edulis (Hottentot fig, highway ice plant) has edible leaves and fruit.
 Mesembryanthemum crystallinum has edible leaves.
 Tetragonia tetragonoides ("New Zealand spinach") is grown as a garden plant in somewhat dry climates and used as an alternative to spinach in upscale salads.C. edulis'' was introduced to California in the early 1900s to stabilize soil along railroad tracks and has become invasive. In southern California, ice plants are sometimes used as firewalls; however, they do burn if not carefully maintained.

References

Further reading

External links

 Aizoaceae in L. Watson and M.J. Dallwitz (1992 onwards). The families of flowering plants
 NCBI Taxonomy Browser
 P. Chesselet (2004 onwards). Interactive Mesembs2
 Plants of southern Africa (2005 onwards). SANBI
 Aizoaceae of South Africa
 Family Aizoaceae Flowers in Israel
 Aizoaceae in BoDD – Botanical Dermatology Database

 
Caryophyllales families
Flora of South Africa
Fynbos
Succulent plants
https://github.com/fo808/pr-test/commit/3de9b12b3eb377f5407d7894ec97c03b7b01900f